Sclerocopa is a genus of moth in the family Gelechiidae. It contains only one species, Sclerocopa heliochra, which is found in Cameroon.

References

Dichomeridinae